Pat Sheehan is a retired American TV journalist.

Sheehan has spent his entire TV journalism career at WTNH-TV, WFSB-TV, and WTIC-TV, as a reporter, and then an anchor, that made him a Connecticut Television icon. He was inducted into the Society of Professional Journalists Hall of Fame in 1998.

He was inducted into the Boston/New England Chapter of the National Academy of Television Arts and Sciences in 1997.

Sheehan graduated from the University of Connecticut, led fundraising campaigns among alumni, and later served as Chairman of the Board of the UConn Foundation.  After serving on the steering committee that developed the university’s UConn 2000 rebuilding program, he established an alumni-based grassroots organization called the UConn Advocates to support university initiatives at the Connecticut General Assembly.

References

American television news anchors
Living people
Year of birth missing (living people)